Only Want You for Your Body is the third album by Australian rock band Buffalo, recorded and originally released in 1974 on the Vertigo label. 

The album was remastered and reissued in November 2005 by Australian record label Aztec Music on CD with additional tracks.

Track listing
All tracks written by Dave Tice and John Baxter, unless noted

 "I'm a Skirt Lifter, Not a Shirt Raiser" – 4:52
 "I'm Coming On" (Alvin Lee) (Ten Years After cover) – 3:39
 "Dune Messiah" – 4:32
 "Stay with Me" – 3:37
 "What's Going On" – 3:57
 "Kings Cross Ladies" – 7:27
 "United Nations" – 6:17
 "What's Going On" (single version)* – 3:20
 "United Nations" (live at Hordern Pavilion, Sydney, April 1974 – recorded for ABC-TV program GTK)* – 7:50

* Bonus tracks on the 2005 Aztec Music reissue

Personnel
 Dave Tice – lead vocals
 Peter Wells – bass
 John Baxter – guitar
 Jimmy Economou – drums

References

Buffalo (band) albums
1974 albums